A.M.G.O.D. (Allotropic/Metamorphic Genesis of Dimorphism) is the third studio album by Finnish industrial black metal band, ...and Oceans. This album incorporates more electronic/industrial elements than past albums.

Track listing

Personnel
 Killstar – Vocals
 Tripster – guitar
 7even II – guitar
 Atomica – bass
 Plasmaar – keyboards
 Martex – drums

References

Havoc Unit albums
2001 albums
Century Media Records albums